The Kings Cup Super 8 Tournament is an annual Muay Thai event staged  on December 5 to honor the birthday of Bhumibol Adulyadej, the King of Thailand. It is held in Bangkok’s Sanam Luang Park, facing the King's Palace. The event is attended by as many as 300,000 Thai fight fans and admirers of the King.

Eight fighters compete in a one-day single-elimination style tournament. The Champion must win three fights all in one day.
 
The Kings Cup Super 8 Crown and Title Belt are donated by the King of Thailand.
 
The event lasts for one week with festivities in honor of the King such as Muay Thai demonstrations including an amateur tournament, Ladies Super 8, and a special youth demonstration.

After 2010, this tournament was no longer held under original conditions.

Past winners

References

External links
 S1champion.com

Muay Thai
Sport in Bangkok
Recurring sporting events established in 2001